Standings and results for Group 5 of the UEFA Euro 1980 qualifying tournament.

Group 5 consisted of Czechoslovakia, France, Luxembourg and Sweden. Group winners were the reigning European champions Czechoslovakia, who pipped France by a single point. This pair dominated the group, winning won all their games against the other two nations, with the exception of France's opening draw with Sweden.

Final table

Results

Goalscorers

References

Group 5
1978–79 in French football
1979–80 in French football
1978–79 in Czechoslovak football
1979–80 in Czechoslovak football
Czechoslovakia at UEFA Euro 1980
1978 in Swedish football
1979 in Swedish football
1978–79 in Luxembourgian football
1979–80 in Luxembourgian football